Vernon Perry Jr. (born September 22, 1953 in Jackson, Mississippi) is a former professional American football player who played safety for five seasons. He played for the Houston Oilers and New Orleans Saints. Previously he played with the Montreal Alouettes of the CFL.  During his NFL career, he intercepted 11 passes and recovered 3 fumbles.

Perry's most notable NFL accomplishment was in a 1979 AFC playoff game against the San Diego Chargers.  In the game, he blocked a field goal and returned it 57 yards before being tackled by the holder, and set an NFL postseason record by intercepting 4 passes from Chargers quarterback Dan Fouts.  In the following playoff game, the AFC Championship, against Pittsburgh, Perry intercepted a Terry Bradshaw pass and returned it 75 yards for a touchdown on Pittsburgh's first possession of the game.

Perry currently owns a Sportswear and Sports Memorabilia Retail store called "32 Sports". He also teaches classes at Jackson State University. Vernon graduated from Wingfield High School and Jackson State University where he had outstanding football careers at both schools.

1953 births
Living people
Players of American football from Jackson, Mississippi 
Players of Canadian football from Jackson, Mississippi
American football safeties
Jackson State Tigers football players
Houston Oilers players
New Orleans Saints players
Montreal Alouettes players